Flying High is the debut studio album by Mixmaster Morris, released under the pseudonym of Irresistible Force in 1992 through Instinct Records.

Track listing

Personnel 
Taylor Deupree – design
Mixmaster Morris – instruments, arrangement, production

References

External links 
 

1992 debut albums
The Irresistible Force albums
Instinct Records albums
Ambient house albums